Bob Bryan and Mike Bryan were the defending champions, but lost in the quarterfinals to Lukáš Rosol and João Sousa.
Daniel Nestor and Nenad Zimonjić won the title, defeating Rohan Bopanna and Aisam-ul-Haq Qureshi in the final, 7–6(7–3), 7–6(7–3).

Seeds

Draw

Draw

References
 Main Draw

M